Lonnie Laffen (July 16, 1958 – December 23, 2020) was an American politician and architect.

Laffen was born in Wimbledon, North Dakota. He received his bachelor's degree in architecture and history from North Dakota State University. Laffen was the founder & president of JLG Architects in Grand Forks, North Dakota. Laffen served in the North Dakota Senate from the 43rd District from 2010 to 2018. He was a member of the Republican party. In 2018, Laffen was defeated for re-election by Democrat JoNell Bakke.

He died of complications from a heart attack on December 23, 2020, in Grand Forks, North Dakota at age 62.

References

1958 births
2020 deaths
Politicians from Grand Forks, North Dakota
People from Barnes County, North Dakota
North Dakota State University alumni
Architects from North Dakota
Republican Party North Dakota state senators
21st-century American politicians